HMAS Sydney (DDG 42), named after the city of Sydney, New South Wales, is the third and final ship of the Hobart class air warfare destroyers used by the Royal Australian Navy (RAN).

Construction
HMAS Sydney was laid down on 19 November 2015, and launched on 19 May 2018. The ship, based on the Álvaro de Bazán-class frigate designed by Navantia, was built at ASC's shipyard in Osborne, South Australia from modules fabricated by ASC, BAE Systems Australia in Victoria, and Forgacs Group in New South Wales. The ship was delivered to Australian Department of Defence on 28 February 2020, after sea trials since September 2019.

Service
HMAS Sydney was commissioned at sea off the coast of New South Wales on 18 May 2020 due to the COVID-19 pandemic. This was the first time since World War II that an Australian warship was commissioned at sea. In March 2021, the ship's combat systems were tested in advance of any operational deployments.

On May 8, 2021 HMAS Sydney struck and killed two endangered fin whales which were discovered after the ship docked at the U.S. Navy base in San Diego, California. The Center for Biological Diversity announced its intent to sue the U.S. Navy and the National Marine Fisheries Service for what it called "violations" of the Endangered Species Act. The incident is under joint review by U.S. and Australian agencies.

References

Hobart-class destroyers
Ships built in South Australia
2018 ships